The 1989 Korean Professional Football League was the seventh season of K League since its establishment in 1983. The Korean Professional Football Committee was merged into the Korea Football Association again in March 1989.

League table

Awards

Main awards

Source:

Best XI

Source:

References

External links
 RSSSF

K League seasons
1
South Korea
South Korea